William Corey (born 1853, date of death unknown) was a United States Navy sailor and a recipient of the United States military's highest decoration, the Medal of Honor.

Biography
Born in 1853 in New York, New York, Corey joined the Navy from that state. For this action, both men were awarded the Medal of Honor two weeks later, on August 9. Another of Plymouth's crew, Seaman Thomas Kersey, rescued a shipmate from drowning on the same day and also received the medal.

Corey's official Medal of Honor citation reads:
On board the U.S.S. Plymouth, Navy Yard, New York, 26 July 1876. Showing heroic conduct, Corey endeavored to save the life of one of the crew of that ship who had fallen overboard from aloft.

See also

List of Medal of Honor recipients during peacetime

References

External links

1853 births
Year of death missing
Military personnel from New York City
United States Navy sailors
United States Navy Medal of Honor recipients
Non-combat recipients of the Medal of Honor